Elizabeth Eleanor Greatorex (1854–1917) was an American painter and illustrator.

Early life
Eleanor Greatorex was born in 1854 in New York City. Her mother was Eliza Pratt Greatorex and her sister, Kathleen Honora Greatorex.

Mid-life and career

She painted primarily flowers and figurative works. Greatorex attended the National Academy of Design from 1869 until 1870. She was a member of the New York Etching Club. She studied under Carolus-Duran and Jean-Jacques Henner, while in Paris in 1879.

She became sick while working in Algiers in 1881. She returned to New York. After she became well, she traveled again, often with her sister. She had a studio with her mother and sister in New York. She was deaf for most of her life.
She is buried on the Moret-sur-Loing cemetery.

Notable collections

"Portrait of Mrs. John Gellatly", 1890–1897, oil on wood; Smithsonian American Art Museum

References

External links
An image and French feature of Eleanor Greatorex via the New York Public Library

Painters from New York City
American women painters
1854 births
1917 deaths
Deaf artists